PDG  may refer to:

Gabonese Democratic Party (Parti démocratique gabonais), the ruling party of Gabon
Democratic Party of Guinea or Parti démocratique de Guinée
Minangkabau International Airport, Padang, Indonesia IATA airport code 
Particle Data Group, international group of particle physicists
Program dependence graph, in computer science, a diagram to clarify dependencies
Patrouille des Glaciers, skiing competition organised by the Swiss military 
Permanent downhole gauge, pressure or temperature gauge in an oil or gas well
Padgate railway station, England (station code) 
PDG S.A., Brazilian real estate company
Président-directeur général, a combination of chairman and CEO in France
Phänomenologie des Geistes (Phenomenology of Spirit) by Hegel
Public Data Group, for accessibility of official UK data